Arisawa (written: 有澤 or 有沢) is a Japanese surname. Notable people with the surname include:

, Japanese writer
, Japanese composer and arranger

Fictional characters:
, character in the manga series Bleach

Japanese-language surnames